is a city located in Yamanashi Prefecture, Japan. ,   the city has an estimated population of 71,618 in 27,956 households, and a population density of 270 persons per km2. Minami-Alps is Yamanashi Prefecture's third largest city. The city's name was chosen in September 2002 from among entries submitted by the general public.

Geography
The city is named for its location on the eastern foothills of the "Southern Alps". This mountain range includes Mount Kita, Japan's second-highest mountain, as well as a number of other mountains that top 3,000 meters. The urbanized zones lie along the three rivers running along these mountains: Midai River, Takizawa River, and Tsubo River. The area is noted for growing fruit, especially: cherries, peaches, plums, grapes, pears, persimmons, kiwi, and apples.

Surrounding municipalities
 Yamanashi Prefecture
 Nirasaki, Hokuto, Kai, Chūō, Ichikawamisato, Fujikawa, Hayakawa, Shōwa
 Nagano Prefecture
 Ina
 Shizuoka Prefecture
 Aoi-ku, Shizuoka

Climate
The city has a climate characterized by characterized by hot and humid summers, and relatively mild winters (Köppen climate classification Cfa).  The average annual temperature in Minami-Alps is 10.3 °C. The average annual rainfall is 1539 mm with September as the wettest month.

Demographics
Per Japanese census data, the population of Minami-Alps has recently plateaued after several decades of growth.

History
The city of Minami-Alps was established on April 1, 2003, by the merger of the towns of Kōsai, Kushigata, Shirane and Wakakusa, and the villages of Ashiyasu and Hatta (all from Nakakoma District).

Government
Minami-Alps has a mayor-council form of government with a directly elected mayor and a unicameral city legislature of 22 members.

Economy
The economy of Minami-Alps is primarily agricultural, with seasonal tourism and forestry playing secondary roles.

Education
Minami-Alps has 15 public elementary schools, one combined public elementary/middle school and six public middle schools operated by the city government. The city has two public high schools and one special education school operated by the Yamanashi Prefectural Board of Education.
 International schools - Alps Gakuen (former Colégio Pitágoras) - Brazilian school

Transportation

Railway
Minami-Alps is the only city in Yamanashi which does not have any passenger railway services.

Highway
 Chūbu-Ōdan Expressway

Sister cities
 Tsubetsu, Hokkaidō, Japan
 Anamizu, Ishikawa, Japan
 Ogasawara, Tokyo, Japan
 Marshalltown, Iowa, United States
 Winterset, Iowa, United States
 Queanbeyan, New South Wales, Australia

Friendship city
 Dujiangyan City, China

Notable people from Minami-Alps
Shin Kanemaru, politician
Tachū Naitō, architect, engineer
Masae Kasai, women's volleyball player
Akira Takabe, professional football player
Kaori Chiba, women's field hockey player

See also
Hōzen-ji
Minami Alps National Park
Minami-Alps Biosphere Reserve

References

External links

Official Website 

 
Cities in Yamanashi Prefecture